Edward Poore ( 1704 – 1780) was the member of the Parliament of Great Britain for Salisbury for the parliament of 1747 to 1754, and for Downton for 13 December 1756 to 1761.

A memorial to him in Salisbury Cathedral was sculpted by John Carline.

References 

Members of Parliament for Salisbury
British MPs 1747–1754
British MPs 1754–1761
1700s births
1780 deaths
Year of birth uncertain